Jamie King (born November 21, 1973 in Edmonton, Alberta) is a Canadian curler.

King was the alternate for the Kevin Koe rink in 2010, where he won 2010 Tim Hortons Brier and 2010 Capital One World Men's Curling Championship. King played in just two games at the World Championships, against Denmark and Japan.  For much of that season, King skipped his own Edmonton-based rink. Following the season, King joined the Warren Hassall rink as third, and then skipped the rink the following season. In 2012, King left the team to form a new team with Blake MacDonald, Scott Pfeifer and Jeff Erickson.

Outside of curling, King is the Senior Vice President of Credit with Servus Credit Union.

External links
 

1973 births
Living people
Curlers from Edmonton
World curling champions
Canadian male curlers